

489001–489100 

|-bgcolor=#f2f2f2
| colspan=4 align=center | 
|}

489101–489200 

|-bgcolor=#f2f2f2
| colspan=4 align=center | 
|}

489201–489300 

|-bgcolor=#f2f2f2
| colspan=4 align=center | 
|}

489301–489400 

|-bgcolor=#f2f2f2
| colspan=4 align=center | 
|}

489401–489500 

|-bgcolor=#f2f2f2
| colspan=4 align=center | 
|}

489501–489600 

|-bgcolor=#f2f2f2
| colspan=4 align=center | 
|}

489601–489700 

|-id=603
| 489603 Kurtschreckling ||  || Kurt Schreckling (born 1939) is a German technician and amateur astronomer. His specialty is the optical measurement technique and the imparting of this knowledge to other amateur astronomers. || 
|}

489701–489800 

|-bgcolor=#f2f2f2
| colspan=4 align=center | 
|}

489801–489900 

|-bgcolor=#f2f2f2
| colspan=4 align=center | 
|}

489901–490000 

|-bgcolor=#f2f2f2
| colspan=4 align=center | 
|}

References 

489001-490000